Josh Tasman-Jones (born 2 July 1990) is a New Zealand cricketer. He made his first-class debut for Otago in the 2016–17 Plunket Shield season on 29 March 2017. He made his Twenty20 debut for Otago in the 2018–19 Super Smash on 20 January 2019.

References

External links
 

1990 births
Living people
New Zealand cricketers
Otago cricketers
Cricketers from Auckland